The 1984–85 Loyola Ramblers men's basketball team represented Loyola University Chicago as a member of the Midwestern City Conference during the 1984–85 NCAA Division I men's basketball season. The head coach was Gene Sullivan. The Ramblers won regular season and conference tournament titles, reached the Sweet Sixteen of the NCAA tournament, finished with a record of 27–6 (13–1 MW City), and were ranked No. 14 in the season's final AP poll.

Roster 

''Sources: Sports Reference, Loyola yearbook

Schedule and results

|-
!colspan=9 style=| Regular season

|-
!colspan=9 style=| Midwestern City Tournament

|-
!colspan=9 style=| NCAA Tournament

Rankings

Awards and honors
Alfredrick Hughes – All-American, Midwestern City Conference Player of the Year (3x), Loyola single-season and career scoring leader, 5th on NCAA career scoring list

NBA Draft

References

External links
 Season statistics at Sports Reference

Loyola Ramblers men's basketball seasons
Loyola
Loyola
Loyola Ramblers
Loyola Ramblers